is a Japanese television drama series, broadcast on TBS in 2007. It is the sequel to the 2005 TV series Boys Over Flowers, based on the original shōjo manga series by Yoko Kamio. It is followed by the film Hana yori Dango Final: The Movie.

Synopsis

Boys Over Flowers returns for a second season, picking up a year after Domyouji Tsukasa left for New York. Tsukushi follows Tsukasa to New York to confront him about his behavior and the reason behind his shocking decision to give her a red notice for the second time. There, she gets lost and becomes prey to thieves and bad men. Suddenly, a flashback takes us one month before Tsukushi left for New York. She mentions that F4 had graduated and during their ceremony they donated a lounge to the cafeteria called the F4 lounge so that they could revisit the school. Later on, Tsukushi mentions that she and Yuki are attending their junior high reunion. At the reunion, she meets Jun Pei, a student who is also attending Eitoku and is in the same grade as her! Back at school, she meets Jun Pei but is unable to recognize him as he is wearing glasses and looks very nerdy. She and Jun Pei quickly become friends and soon after she finds out that he is a model in disguise when he takes her to his work studio! He convinces her to take a photo with him telling her it won't be published but it ends up getting published anyway. Soon after, Tsukushi is given a red notice and finds out that Tsukasa had told one of the students to give it to her for old time's sake. She is then challenged by everyone and while she struggles to fight Jun Pei comes to her rescue. Later, when Tsukushi speaks with Rui he tells her she should go to New York but she refuses and when she goes home that evening she finds out that her dad had won a ticket to New York for 3 days. She takes the ticket and we are brought back to the present where she is prey to thieves. Suddenly Rui arrives and saves her in the nick of time and tells her that Soujiro and Akira will arrive after. Tsukushi finds Tsukasa and speaks with him and she realizes that since he left Japan, he has indeed changed. Upset with his cold attitude, Tsukushi returns to Japan while the F3 remained to ask Tsukasa if he was really behind the red notice but this surprised Tsukasa!

Upon returning to Japan, Tsukushi is tortured at school because of the red notice but once again Jun Pei comes to her rescue and in the process reveals his identity as Jun the famous model. Jun tells Tsukushi that he will protect her but when he leaves, he tells his men to take her away and soon Tsukushi finds out that Jun is using her to try to get to Tsukasa in order to get revenge for his friend who was beaten up severely by Tsukasa. During Jun's story Tsukushi manages to escape and is found by Tsukasa's sister Tsubaki who sends her men after Jun Pei. Later Tsukushi confesses to Tsubaki that she still loves Tsukasa but is unsure of what to do to get back with him since he's changed too much.

Later on, Tsukushi is invited to Tsukasa's birthday party by his mother Kaede. Tsukushi decides to make him a present similar to the one she gave him when he left for New York and dresses up in a fancy dress which Tsubaki had bought for her. During her son's birthday party Kaede announces Tsukasa's engagement to Ohkawahara Shigeru, the only daughter of a Japanese oil magnate. After Kaede makes her announcement she embarrasses Tsukushi by calling her up on stage to play the piano which she is unable to do. She congratulates Tsukasa and runs out followed by him. He confronts her about the engagement telling her that she should not have come since it was all part of Kaede's plans. Tsukushi says it doesn't matter since they are no longer in a relationship and before she can finish what she was saying Kaede arrives and agrees with what Tsukushi had said, followed by Shigeru who is shocked about the earlier events. Tsukasa then yells at his mother and tries to leave with Tsukushi but instead mistakenly grabs Shigeru's arm and leaves with her. To make things even more complicated, Shigeru falls in love with Tsukasa after their interactions out on the street. Tsukushi, in an effort to deal with the painful events regarding her past love, immerses herself in her studies to get into law school with the help of Rui. As they grow closer, Rui realizes his true feelings for her. During this time, Tsukushi finds out that her family is having money issues and she decides to take a second job in order to help her family with expenses but it is too much for her and she collapses during work. She is taken to the hospital and while Tsukasa is at a dinner with Shigeru and her family, Nishida informs him about Tsukushi being taken to the hospital and he rushes off to see her. Just before Tsukasa enters Tsukushi's room, he sees Rui and leaves confused about why he is there. Later, when Tsukushi wakes up she sees Rui, realizing that he had stayed the night and when he awakes he kisses her then leaves. When Tsukushi finally gets discharged from the hospital and goes home she finds out that her father was fired and left with her mother to go to a nearby village to become a fisherman in order to earn income. Tsukushi starts packing her belongings and is notified by Yuki that she knows someone in her tea class who might have a place for her and her brother to stay at. They start living in an old building and find out that Tsukasa is living next to them since he had purchased the building. Later on, Tsukushi and Tsukasa have a fight which results in him landing on top of her. Shigeru suddenly arrives, sees them and runs out of the building.

Tsukushi tries to run after her but Tsukasa stops her telling her "not to go". She then tells him to leave and he does so. Then Tsukushi's brother Susumu asks Tsukasa for help on how to confess to a girl he met when he took his entrance exam. Tsukasa agrees and gets the rest of F4 to help. Unfortunately when Susumu confesses to the girl he likes, she refuses and he is heart broken. Meanwhile, Tsukushi is out searching for Susumu since it is very late. Eventually she finds him with Tsukasa. She yells at Tsukasa telling him that he's causing problems in her life and suddenly he confesses to her saying that he wants to date her again. She runs off and back at home Susumu tells her that she should at least inform Rui about her and Tsukasa since he deserves to know. Tsukushi tries phoning Rui but hangs up because she was afraid and didn't know what to say, after hearing her hang up the phone Rui gets into his car and drives to her place. Soon after Nishida, the company secretary, finally reveals the real reason for Tsukasa's change of behavior which leaves Tsukushi confused. After her talk with Nishida, Tsukushi sees Rui waiting outside her house to talk to her. He eventually leaves and a little afterwards Tsukasa ends up in Tsukushi's room since Susumu wants to use his room to study and the two end up in a fight which results in huge damage to Tsukushi's room, adding humour to the episode. While Susumu goes to stay with her parents, she ends up staying at the Domyouji mansion and working as a maid thanks to Tsubaki's help. While at the mansion, she befriends Tama, an old housekeeper of the Domyouji clan. After realising that she's in between Tsukasa and Tsukushi, Shigeru eventually breaks off the engagement to Tsukasa. This results in his disinheritance and further worsens the crisis faced by the Domyouji World Finance Group. Later, Kaede Domyouji attempts to reconcile Ohkawahara's consideration of the marriage, but is rebuffed. While Tsukushi and Tsukasa go on a cafe date, his card is declined because of his mother. After exiting the pet store, they see Nishida, who reveals he was dismissed. In an effort to save him and the employees of the company, Makino unwillingly breaks up with Tsukasa and follows her family to a fishing village to start a new life. Tsukasa goes after her, however. There, he gets into an accident after saving Susumu, Makino's younger brother, and develops amnesia. Her attempts at helping him revive his memories are thwarted by Umi, a patient in the same hospital where Tsukasa had been admitted. In one occasion, Susumu advises Makino to make something for him to eat. The next day, while Tsukasa is still fast asleep, Makino pays him a visit and makes an effort to hypnotize him using the necklace he once gave to her. Umi drops by to exchange some of the flowers in his room. Next to Tsukasa laid a package within which were cookies shaped like Tsukasa's face. He reaches in to eat one of them and recalls that "they taste like love." He begins to question if "Umi" was the person he can't remember. A hesitant Umi smiles and gives him a kiss. The next day Tsukushi visits his room once again, only to find the room vacant. Confused by this, she panics, but Rui reassures her that Tsukasa is probably home. As soon as she enters, she sees Umi in Tsukasa's room. While Umi makes tea, Tsukasa and Tsukushi argue. When Umi comes back, she privately speaks to Tsukushi and tells her to never come to the mansion again, saying that Tsukushi's presence upsets Tsukasa and that it would be harder for her to get him to remember his lost memory. Later on, Tsukushi sees Tsukasa and Umi talking about the cookies she had made for him and realizes that Umi had taken credit for what she had made. Upset, Tsukushi throws the Saturn pearl necklace at Tsukasa, saying she's had enough. She then decides to give up and tells Yuki and the F3 that she's at her limit and about how Umi lied about the cookies. F3 then, making an attempt so that Tsukasa can remember Tsukushi, goes to a skiing resort inviting Tsukasa, Tsukushi and Yuki with them. To the surprise of the F3 and Tsukushi, Tsukasa is accompanied by Umi. Umi is now acting as if she is Tsukasa's girlfriend and shows people that she's really close with him. Akira, surprised, asks Tsukasa about Umi's presence. Later in the evening, Tsukasa is in his room, confused as to why people want him to remember Tsukushi. Tsukasa, after eating some cookies that Umi had made for him, shouts at her telling her that she lied to him about making the other cookies. Umi admits that she lied to him about the cookies, then leaves the room after Tsukasa tells her he wants nothing more to do with her. Around the same time, Tsukushi is unable to find Yuki and asks Umi if she had seen her. Frustrated, Umi tells her that she's gone to the summit of the hill to retrieve something she lost but Yuki was just taking a dip in the hot springs. In an attempt to find Yuki, Tsukushi goes out into the blizzard to the summit where she believes Yuki is lost. Then F3 and Yuki realises that Umi lied to Tsukushi and now Tsukushi is in the blizzard. Overhearing the whole conversation, Tsukasa, despite still not remembering who Tsukushi is, runs after her into the blizzard in an attempt to save her.

After saving Makino from being frozen to death in the blizzard, Tsukushi asks him whether he remembers her or not. He replies that he still doesn't remember, but when he found out that Tsukushi could die, his body took over. Tsukasa finally remembers her as the "first girl he has ever fallen in love with" after developing a fever, as the circumstances were similar to their disastrous first date in season 1. Tsukasa finally regains his memories. He then proposes to her after her prom, with their friends and the rest of the Eitoku students cheering them on. The series ends with Tsukushi and Tsukasa meeting up for their date at Ebisu Garden place, this time as an engaged couple.

Cast

Main Cast
Mao Inoue as Makino Tsukushi
Jun Matsumoto as Domyouji Tsukasa
Shun Oguri as Hanazawa Rui
Shota Matsuda as Nishikado Sojiro
Tsuyoshi Abe as Mimasaka Akira

Supporting Cast
 Aki Nishihara as Yuuki Matsuoka
 Natsuki Katō as Okawahara Shigeru
 Mayumi Sada as Shizuka Todo
 Seto Saki as Asai Yuriko
 Fukada Aki as Ayuhara Erika
 Matsuoka Emiko as Yamano Minako
 Megumi Sato as Sakurako Sanjo
 Nanako Matsushima as Tsubaki Domyouji
 Mariko Kaga as Kaede Domyouji
 Ito David as Nishida
 Takako Kato as Sachiyo Sengoku (Okami-San)
 Susumu Kobayashi as Haruo Makino
 Mako Ishino as Chieko Makino
 Satoshi Tomiura as Susumu Makino

Guests
 Ikuta Toma as Oribe Junpei (Episode 1)
 Yanagisawa Takahiko as Junpei's Older Brother (Episode 1)
 Nakae Daiki as Oribe Shingo (Episode 1)
 Kaku Tomohiro as Sawatari Shingo, The Bully Student (Episode 1)
 Fujisaki Yurie as Maeda Miki (Episode 1)
 Hagiwara Kazuki (Episode 1)
 Oomasa Aya as Student of Class 3-C
 Saito Michi as student of Class 3-C
 Tsurumi Shingo as Uchida Ken (Domyoji Group Employee, Episode 1-10)
 Suigetsu Mai as Uchida Ken's Wife (Episode 1–6)
 Hashida Honoka as Uchida Ken's Child (Episode 1–6)
 Miyazaki Midori as Uchida Ken's Child (Episode 1–6)
 Asaoka Satoshi (Episode 1,2)
 Nishimura Tomomi as Akira's mother (Episode 3)
 Kitayama Imari as Akira's sister (Episode 3)
 Kitayama Himawari as Akira's sister (Episode 3)
 Kanjiya Shihori as Hinata Sara (Episode 3–7)
 Sasaki Katsuhiko as Shigeru's Father (Episode 3,8)
 Mitani Yumi as Shigeru's Mother (Episode 3,8)
 Misuzawa Nako as Miyuki (Episode 5)
 Sasaki Sumie as Tama (Episode 6,9)
 Asanuma Shinpei as the Principal of Hidenori Gakuen (Episode 6)
 Yatsu Isao (Episode 6)
 Yasuda Yoko (Episode 6)
 Saito Yukino as a Friend of F4 (Episode 6)
 Morita Konomi as a Friend of F4 (Episode 6,7)
 Tanaka Kei as Hinata Sara's Fiancé (Episode 7)
 Yakura Akira as The Husband of Tama (Episode 8)
 Tanaka Natsuko as Young Tama (Episode 8)
 Okayama Hajime as Yuuki's Father (Episode 9)
 Hiki Rie as Yuuki's Mother (Episode 9)
 Yamamoto Kei (Episode 10)
 Toda Erika as Nakashima Umi (Episode 10,11)
 Higashino Kouji as a Member of the Rescue Team (Episode 11)
 Komoriya Toru as the reporter (Episode 11)
 Matsumoto Tamaki

Production Credits 
 Based on the Boys Over Flowers Comics by: Yoko Kamio
 Screenwriter: Satake Mikio
 Producers: Setoguchi Katsuaki, Mishiro Shinichi
 Directors: Ishii Yasuharu, Tsuboi Toshio, Takei Atsushi
 Music: Kosuke Yamashita

Reception

Episode Ratings

Source: Video Research, Ltd.

Recognitions

International broadcast 

In the Philippines, the drama aired under the title Hana yori Dango 2 on GMA Network.

References

External links
 Official TV drama website from TBS 
  in the TBS Program Catalog 
 

2007 Japanese television series endings
2007 Japanese television series debuts
Boys Over Flowers
Kin'yō Dorama
Japanese television dramas based on manga